The Saint Nicholas Society of the City of New York, founded in 1835, is a charitable organization of men who are descended from early inhabitants of the State of New York.

Governance
The Society is led by a President, four Vice Presidents, Secretary, Treasurer, Historian, Genealogist, Assistant Genealogist, Chaplains, and Physicians.

List of presidents

References

External links
 Portraits of the presidents of the society, 1835-1914
 

Organizations based in New York City
Organizations established in 1835
Lineage societies
Dutch-American history
Dutch-American culture in New York City
Ethnic fraternal orders in the United States